Valerian Ruminski (born 1967) is an American operatic bass. He is also the founder and artistic director of Nickel City Opera, in Buffalo, New York.

Life and career
Named Martin Matthew Ruminski by his adoptive parents Mary and Valerian Ruminski, he was born in Lackawanna, New York and grew up in nearby Cheektowaga. As a child he sang in the St. Paul's Cathedral Men and Boys Choir. He later sang in the Canisius High School choir. He studied music at SUNY Buffalo where he graduated with a Bachelor of Music degree in 1995 and went on to further study at the Academy of Vocal Arts in Philadelphia. While he was at AVA, he also did apprenticeships with Santa Fe Opera and Chautauqua Opera during the summers. Since the start of his career, he has performed under the first name "Valerian" as a tribute to his late father.

In 1999 Rudinski was signed by the New York City Opera to sing in Bizet's Carmen. After his audition, Beverly Sills singled him out for the 1999 Lincoln Center Martin Segal Award. The following year he received a Career Grant from the Richard Tucker Music Foundation and won the $20,000 First Prize in the MacAllister Singing Competition. The judges at the MacAllister Competition were struck by the unusual pieces Ruminski chose to present—arias from Ambroise Thomas's little-known opera Le caïd and The Tempest, a baroque work attributed to Purcell. A scout from the Metropolitan Opera had heard Ruminski's performances at the NYCO and invited him to audition for the Met. He made his Metropolitan Opera debut on 17 January 2001 as Zuniga in Carmen. He later sang there as Gualtiero in I puritani (2006–2007) and Nikitich in Boris Godunov (2010–2011). In the course of his operatic career, Ruminski has sung in many opera houses in the United States and Canada. Early in his career he also appeared in Israel with the New Israeli Opera and in Monaco with the Opéra de Monte-Carlo.

Nickel City Opera
In 2004 Ruminski founded Nickel City Opera, a small opera company based in Buffalo, New York. After several years of fund-raising and a search for a sponsoring venue, the company's first production, The Barber of Seville, opened in 2009 at the Riviera Theatre in North Tonawanda, a small city near Buffalo. Most of their productions have been staged at the Riviera Theatre, although they staged Puccini's Il Tabarro in 2011 on the decommissioned USS The Sullivans, docked at the Buffalo and Erie County Naval & Military Park and the world premiere of SHOT! in 2016 at Shea's Theatre in downtown Buffalo. From 2017 the company also began touring their productions and concerts in the Buffalo metropolitan area.

Ruminski's performances in Nickel City Opera's productions have included Don Basilio in The Barber of Seville (2009), Colline in La bohème (2011), Figaro in The Marriage of Figaro (2015), and William McKinley in the world premiere of SHOT! (2016). Composed by Persis Vehar, SHOT! is based on events surrounding the assassination of President William McKinley who was shot in Buffalo in September 1901 while attending a reception at the Temple of Music. In addition to his performances, Ruminski has co-directed some of the company's productions and in 2014 also directed the Buffalo Philharmonic Orchestra's production of Bartok's Bluebeard's Castle, featuring the glass sculptures of Dale Chihuly.

In 2017, Ruminski received Opera America's Bravo Service Award, whose recipients "promote opera in their communities and work tirelessly to ensure the highest possible artistic quality and community service."

Roles and opera companies
Ruminski's opera performances have included, among others:

Skołuba in The Haunted Manor (Greater Buffalo Opera, 1997)
Colline in La bohème (New York City Opera, 1999)
Zuniga in Carmen (New York City Opera, 1999; Metropolitan Opera, 2001)
Albert in La Juive (New Israeli Opera, 2000)
Sparafucile in Rigoletto (New Israeli Opera, 2000)
 Ferrando in Il trovatore (Michigan Opera Theatre, 2002)
Dottore Grenvil in La traviata (Santa Fe Opera, 2002)<ref>The Santa Fe New Mexican (19 July 2002). "Love in the Time of Opera", p. 94. Retrieved 29 October 2017.</ref>
Fenicio in Ermione (Dallas Opera, 2003; New York City Opera, 2004)Midgette, Anne (13 April 2004). "Long Buried, Rossini Work Rises to the Occasion". New York Times. Retrieved 29 October 2017.
The King of Egypt in Aida (Opéra de Monte-Carlo, 2004; Florida Grand Opera, 2006)Roca, Octavio (2 November 2006). "Vigorous Verdi". Miami New Times. Retrieved 30 October 2017.
Frère Laurent in Roméo et Juliette (Opera Lyra, 2005)
 Don Alfonso in Così fan tutte (Seattle Opera, 2006)
Gualtiero in I puritani (Metropolitan Opera, 2006–2007) 
Licaone in Giove in Argo (concert performance, Avery Fisher Hall, 2008)
Garibaldo in Rodelinda (Portland Opera, 2008)
Monterone in Rigoletto (Toledo Opera, 2008) 
Sarastro in The Magic Flute (Opera Lyra, 2009; Opera Ireland, 2009)
Banquo in Macbeth (Opera Ireland, 2009)
Nikitich in Boris Godunov (Metropolitan Opera, 2010–2011)
Marquis d'Obigny in La traviata (concert performance, Vienna Musikverein, 2010)
Raimondo in Lucia di Lammermoor (Hawaii Opera Theatre, 2011)
The title role in Don Pasquale (Hawaii Opera Theatre, 2012)
Don Magnifico in La Cenerentola (Seattle Opera, 2013)
 Rocco in Fidelio (Manitoba Opera, 2014)
Daland in The Flying Dutchman (Calgary Opera, 2014)
Nilakantha in Lakme (Calgary Opera, 2015)
Timur in Turandot (Manitoba Opera, 2015)
Bartolo in The Barber of Seville (Opera San Jose, 2016)
Sacristan in Tosca (Opéra de Montréal, 2017)

In concert and recital
Ruminski's concert and recital performances have included, among others:
Solo recital, including the world premiere of six songs set to poems by Charles Bukowski (Zipper Hall, 2000) 
Handel's Messiah, as bass soloist (Buffalo Philharmonic, 2002)
Shostakovich's Song of the Forests, as bass soloist (Bard Music Festival, 2004)
Beethoven's 9th Symphony, as bass soloist (Buffalo Philharmonic, 2005; Honolulu Symphony. 2010)Goldman, Mary Kunz (5 January 2010). "Our man in Honolulu". The Buffalo News. Retrieved 29 October 2017 .

Recordings
Ruminski's recordings include:A Night at the Opera: Favourite opera arias, duets and ensembles – Mariusz Kwiecien, Valerian Ruminski. Matthew Polenzani, Kristine Jepson, Indra Thomas; Royal Philharmonic Orchestra, Charles Rosenkrans (conductor). CD 2004. Label: NaxosI Puritani – Anna Netrebko (Elvira), Eric Cutler (Arturo), Franco Vassallo (Riccardo), John Relyea (Giorgio), Valerian Ruminski (Gualtiero); Metropolitan Opera Orchestra and Chorus, Patrick Summers (conductor). DVD 2007. Label: Deutsche GrammophonVictor Herbert: Collected Songs – various artists (Ruminski sings seven selections). CD 2012. Label: New World Records

References

External links
 Official site
Ruminski, Valerian (1 September 2010) "Success often requires burning midnight oil". The Buffalo News''.
Valerian Ruminski at Randsman Artists Management
Valerian Ruminski at the Internet Movie Database

1967 births
Living people
American opera singers
Musicians from Buffalo, New York
American people of Polish descent
Classical musicians from New York (state)